Nishad Tharanga Paranavitana (born 15 April 1982) is a former Sri Lankan Test cricketer. He is an opening batsman and an off-break bowler. He retired from all forms of cricket in August 2020.

Domestic career
He made the most runs in the 2015–16 Premier League Tournament, with a total of 953 from 10 matches and 17 innings.

In March 2018, he was named in Kandy's squad for the 2017–18 Super Four Provincial Tournament. The following month, he was also named in Kandy's squad for the 2018 Super Provincial One Day Tournament.

International career
He made his international debut in a Test match against Pakistan in February 2009. During the second Test match of that series, while heading for the third day's play, he became one of the Sri Lankan cricketers wounded when their team bus was attacked by terrorists in Lahore, Pakistan.

Despite being attacked and  badly injured, Paranavitana recovered to register his maiden Test century sixteen months later on 18 July 2010 against India at Galle, Sri Lanka. He was dropped from the Test team at the end of 2011, being replaced by Lahiru Thirimanne for Sri Lanka's third Test of their tour of South Africa.

Paranavitana scored two centuries in Test matches. The first, a score of 111, was made against India at Galle in July 2010. The second came in the same month in the following match of India's tour of Sri Lanka, Paranavitana scoring exactly 100 runs.

Notes

External links
 

1982 births
Living people
Sri Lankan cricketers
Sri Lanka Test cricketers
Sri Lankan terrorism victims
Uva cricketers
Kandurata cricketers
Sinhalese Sports Club cricketers
Kandurata Warriors cricketers
Jaffna District cricketers
Abahani Limited cricketers